Dehjalal (also Romanized as Dehjalāl; also known as Dekh-Dzhalal) is a village in Sojas Rud Rural District, Sojas Rud District, Khodabandeh County, Zanjan Province, Iran. At the 2006 census, its population was 505, in 115 families.

References 

Populated places in Khodabandeh County